Dave Sharp (born January 28,1959) is an English guitarist who co-founded, along with Mike Peters, the Welsh punk/new wave band The Alarm.

Early career
Sharp was born in Kersal, Salford, Lancashire, and began playing with the band Seventeen in the 1970s; he made his recording debut on their "Don't Let Go" / "Bank Holiday Weekend" single. After Seventeen disbanded in 1980, the band reformed as The Alarm, eventually recording hit records such as "68 Guns" and "The Spirit of '76".

Hard Travelers
Towards the end of 2007, Sharp having spent most of his recent time playing solo acoustic, was ready to form a new band.  He was put in touch with Henry McCullough and the nucleus of The Hard Travelers was formed.  The concept of the band's music was intended to bring the songs of Woody Guthrie to a new public. To complete the lineup, Sharp and McCullough brought in Zoot Money on keyboards; Gary Fletcher on bass; and Colin Allen on drums.

Their debut gig was on January 22, 2008 at The Cellars in Portsmouth. The following gigs had to be postponed due to various difficulties and their next performance was scheduled for The Black Horse Festival, Hastings where they headlined on May 24, 2008.

Sharp went on to form another lineup for the band, featuring guitarist Scott Poley, Norman Cooke (Drums), Christian Madden (Hammond Organ), and Paul Sudlow (Acoustic Guitar).  After only a short time in the studio, the lineup disbanded.

AOR - The Spirit of The Alarm
In April 2008, Sharp launched his own version of The Alarm, AOR - Spirit of The Alarm, to showcase the band's American setlists from the late 1980s. Together with North West musicians, Wayne Parry, Dave Black, Tom Szakaly, and Si Smith, AOR played their debut gig at Glasgow Rockers on April 18, later supporting The Damned at Heywood Civic Centre in support of the Sophie Lancaster Foundation on November 26, 2008.

Sharp currently tours the United Kingdom with regular visits to Scotland and Wales. Sharp has also played regular support slots for The Alarm including the 2017 Viral Black tour.

Discography
Solo albums
 Hard Travellin''' (1991)
 Downtown America'' (1996)

References

External links
 Dave Sharp's website
 Hard Travelers website

1959 births
Living people
English rock guitarists
English new wave musicians
The Alarm members
People from Salford